Ikechukwu Ezeh Ugwuzor (born 20 December 1987, in Oyo) is a Nigerian professional football striker last playing with FK Jezero in the Montenegrin Second League.

Career
During his career, beside Sharks F.C., Niger Tornadoes F.C., and FC Ebedei in Nigeria, he represented the Serbian clubs FK Hajduk Beograd (Serbian First League) and FK Napredak Kruševac (Serbian SuperLiga), Swedish FC Väsby United, and Montenegrin FK Kom and FK Dečić in the Montenegrin First League.

References

External sources
 Profile and photo at Napredak official website
 Stats from Montenegro at FSCG.co.me
 Player´s video on YouTube

Living people
1987 births
Sportspeople from Oyo State
Association football forwards
Nigerian footballers
Sharks F.C. players
Niger Tornadoes F.C. players
FK Hajduk Beograd players
FK Napredak Kruševac players
Serbian First League players
Serbian SuperLiga players
AFC Eskilstuna players
FK Kom players
FK Dečić players
Montenegrin First League players
FK Jezero players
F.C. Ebedei players
Nigerian expatriate footballers
Nigerian expatriate sportspeople in Serbia
Expatriate footballers in Serbia
Nigerian expatriate sportspeople in Sweden
Expatriate footballers in Sweden
Nigerian expatriate sportspeople in Montenegro
Expatriate footballers in Montenegro